BMW Group Classic is an automobile museum from BMW in Moosacher Straße 80 in Am Riesenfeld in Munich.

One can book guided tours to see historic cars of the collection.
BMW Group Classic is organizer of the Concorso d'Eleganza Villa d'Este.

External links 
 Official website

Buildings and structures in Munich
BMW
Automobile museums in Germany
Milbertshofen-Am Hart